Fernando Espino Arévalo (born 22 February 1949) is a Mexican politician affiliated with the Ecologist Green Party of Mexico. Since 1978, he has worked as the Secretary-General of the National Union of Workers of the Mexico City Metro. In 2014, he served as Deputy of the LV and LIX Legislatures of the Mexican Congress in a proportional representation.

References

External sources
 Profile (in Spanish) at the Sistema de Información Legislativa Database

1949 births
Living people
People from Morelia
Politicians from Michoacán
Members of the Chamber of Deputies (Mexico)
Ecologist Green Party of Mexico politicians
21st-century Mexican politicians
Instituto Politécnico Nacional alumni
Academic staff of the Instituto Politécnico Nacional
20th-century Mexican politicians
Members of the Congress of Mexico City
Mexican trade unionists
Deputies of the LIX Legislature of Mexico